Maftuna Jonimqulova (born 26 July 1999) is an Uzbekistani footballer who plays as a goalkeeper for Women's Championship club Sevinch and the Uzbekistan women's national team.

International career
Jonimqulova capped for Uzbekistan at senior level during the 2018 AFC Women's Asian Cup qualification.

International goals
Scores and results list Uzbekistan's goal tally first

See also
List of Uzbekistan women's international footballers

References 

1999 births
Living people
Uzbekistani women's footballers
Uzbekistan women's international footballers
Women's association football goalkeepers
People from Qashqadaryo Region
Uzbekistani women's futsal players
Futsal goalkeepers
21st-century Uzbekistani women